Marvin "Barney" Lewellyn (February 11, 1919 – August 28, 2010) was an American football coach. He served as the head football coach at the South Dakota School of Mines in Rapid City, South Dakota from 1947 to 1951. He moved to Wayne, Nebraska to become the head football coach at Wayne State College from 1952 to 1957.

Head coaching record

References

1919 births
2010 deaths
University of Northern Iowa alumni
University of Iowa alumni
Gustavus Adolphus Golden Gusties football coaches
Minnesota State Mavericks football coaches
South Dakota Mines Hardrockers football coaches
Wayne State Wildcats football coaches
People from Chariton, Iowa